Prionolabis is a genus of crane fly in the family Limoniidae.

Species

P. acanthophora (Alexander, 1938)
P. acutistylus (Alexander, 1925)
P. antennata (Coquillett, 1905)
P. astans Stary, 1982
P. atrofemorata (Alexander, 1954)
P. auribasis (Alexander, 1918)
P. barberi (Alexander, 1916)
P. boharti (Alexander, 1943)
P. carbonis (Alexander, 1938)
P. clavaria (Alexander, 1950)
P. cognata (Lackschewitz, 1940)
P. coracina (Alexander, 1964)
P. cressoni (Alexander, 1917)
P. dis (Alexander, 1950)
P. extensa (Alexander, 1958)
P. fletcheri (Senior-White, 1922)
P. fokiensis (Alexander, 1941)
P. freeborni (Alexander, 1943)
P. gruiformis (Alexander, 1945)
P. habrosyne (Alexander, 1970)
P. harukonis (Alexander, 1934)
P. hepatica (Alexander, 1919)
P. hospes (Egger, 1863)
P. imanishii (Alexander, 1932)
P. indistincta (Doane, 1900)
P. inermis (Alexander, 1934)
P. inopis (Alexander, 1970)
P. isis (Alexander, 1958)
P. iyoensis (Alexander, 1955)
P. kingdonwardi (Alexander, 1963)
P. kunimiana (Alexander, 1969)
P. lictor (Alexander, 1940)
P. liponeura (Alexander, 1930)
P. lipophleps (Alexander, 1930)
P. longeantennata (Strobl, 1910)
P. luteibasalis (Alexander, 1934)
P. majorina (Alexander, 1958)
P. mecocera (Alexander, 1964)
P. mendli Savchenko, 1983
P. munda (Osten Sacken, 1869)
P. mundoides (Alexander, 1916)
P. neomunda (Alexander, 1925)
P. nigrilunae (Tokunaga, 1935)
P. nigronitida (Edwards, 1921)
P. odai (Alexander, 1933)
P. oregonensis (Alexander, 1940)
P. oritropha (Alexander, 1928)
P. paramunda (Alexander, 1949)
P. pilosula (Alexander, 1936)
P. poliochroa (Alexander, 1940)
P. politissima (Alexander, 1941)
P. recurvans (Alexander, 1953)
P. rudimentis (Alexander, 1941)
P. rufibasis (Osten Sacken, 1860)
P. rufipennis (Alexander, 1919)
P. scaria (Alexander, 1945)
P. schmidi Stary, 2006
P. sequoiarum (Alexander, 1943)
P. serridentata (Alexander, 1930)
P. shikokuana (Alexander, 1953)
P. simplex (Alexander, 1911)
P. sounkyana (Alexander, 1934)
P. subcognata Savchenko, 1971
P. submunda (Alexander, 1918)
P. terebrans (Alexander, 1916)
P. uncinata (Alexander, 1954)
P. vancouverensis (Alexander, 1943)
P. walleyi (Alexander, 1929)
P. yamamotana (Alexander, 1938)
P. yankovskyana (Alexander, 1940)

References

Limoniidae